Félix Julien Jean Bigot de Préameneu (26 March 1747 - 31 July 1825) was one of the four legal authors of the Napoleonic Code written at the request of Napoleon at the beginning of the nineteenth century.

Biography 

Bigot de Préameneu was a lawyer for the Parlement of Brittany, then to the Parlement of Paris before the revolution, and was also a member of the Legislative Assembly in 1791.

He professed moderate opinions and was among the defenders of Louis XVI, but he departed from parliamentary politics after the Commune, becoming a judge under the National Constituent Assembly and the Directory.

Under the Consulate, he was appointed government commissioner by the supreme court. In 1802, he was appointed as legislative president of the Council of State and was one of the four jurist authors of the Code Napoleon, led by Cambacérès and instigated by Napoleon I of France in 1800.

In 1803, he was elected to the Académie française. In 1808, he replaced Portalis as Minister of Public Worship. He was made a count of the empire on 24 April 1808, and became a peer of France during the Hundred Days.

He married Eulalie Marie Renée Barbier, daughter of Aimé Francois Barbier and Jeanne Dufour.

Bigot lost all his responsibilities at the beginning of the second Restoration. He died on 31 July 1825 in Paris and is buried in Père Lachaise Cemetery (14th division).

References
Biography of Félix Julien Jean Bigot de Préameneu on the Napoleon & Empire website (in English).
Félix-Julien-Jean Bigot de Préameneu (1747-1825) (in English)

1747 births
1825 deaths
Conseil d'État (France)
French jurists
People of the First French Empire
Members of the Académie Française
Members of the Chamber of Peers of the Hundred Days
French Ministers of Religious Affairs
Burials at Père Lachaise Cemetery
18th-century jurists
19th-century jurists